Igor Vitalyevich Kutergin (born 4 April 1999) is a Russian football player.

Club career
He made his debut in the Russian Professional Football League for FC Neftekhimik Nizhnekamsk on 21 April 2019 in a game against FC Zvezda Perm. He made his Russian Football National League debut for Neftekhimik on 13 July 2019 in a game against FC Nizhny Novgorod.

References

External links
 Profile by Russian Professional Football League
 

1999 births
People from Nizhnekamsk
Sportspeople from Tatarstan
Living people
Russian footballers
Association football defenders
FC Neftekhimik Nizhnekamsk players